was the thirteenth of the fifty-three stations of the Tōkaidō. It is located in the present-day city of Numazu, Shizuoka Prefecture, Japan.

History
Hara-juku was a smaller post town on the coast of Suruga Bay between Numazu-juku and Yoshiwara-juku in Suruga Province. It is the site of many paintings because of Mount Fuji in the background.

The classic ukiyo-e print by Andō Hiroshige (Hōeidō edition) from 1831 to 1834 depicts two women travelers walking past a huge snowy Mount Fuji. The women are accompanied by a manservant who is carrying their luggage.  By contrast, the Kyōka edition of the late 1830s depicts three small teahouses, dwarfed by a huge, red Mount Fuji which protrudes out of the picture into the top margin.

Neighboring post towns
Tōkaidō
Numazu-juku - Hara-juku - Yoshiwara-juku

References

Carey, Patrick. Rediscovering the Old Tokaido:In the Footsteps of Hiroshige. Global Books UK (2000). 
Chiba, Reiko. Hiroshige's Tokaido in Prints and Poetry. Tuttle. (1982) 
Taganau, Jilly. The Tokaido Road: Travelling and Representation in Edo and Meiji Japan. RoutledgeCurzon (2004). 

Stations of the Tōkaidō
Stations of the Tōkaidō in Shizuoka Prefecture